Lih Kolam (also Romanized as Līh Kolām; also known as Likolom) is a village in Owshiyan Rural District, Chaboksar District, Rudsar County, Gilan Province, Iran. At the 2006 census, its population was 216, in 58 families.

References 

Populated places in Rudsar County